Robert Funk may refer to:

 Robert W. Funk (1926–2005), American biblical scholar
 Robert A. Funk, founder and CEO of Express Employment Professionals